The 47 is a bus route that operates between Bristol and Yate. It is operated by First West of England.

History 
In 2021, evening and Sunday services on route 5 were withdrawn and the leg to Bromley Heath was removed.

Route 47 was introduced in October 2022 as a partial replacement for routes 5, Y3, Y4, and Y5.

In late February 2023, First announced that the 47 would be withdrawn on 2 April, blaming low passenger numbers. A replacement service will be introduced between Emersons Green and Yate, however, St Werburghs will be left without any bus services.

Route 
The route starts in Bristol city centre and runs through St Pauls, St Werburghs, Eastville, Fishponds, Downend, Emersons Green, Pucklechurch, and Westerleigh. On reaching Yate, the route takes a 25-minute loop around the town before terminating at Yate Shopping Centre. The full route takes around 1.5 hours end-to-end and runs on an hourly frequency. There is no evening or Sunday service.

References 

Bus routes in England
Transport in Bristol